Star-Spangled Banner may refer to:
 Flag of the United States, the national flag of the United States in general
 Star-Spangled Banner (flag), the actual flag that flew over Fort McHenry on September 14, 1814 that inspired the national anthem of the United States
 "The Star-Spangled Banner", the national anthem of the United States
 The Star Spangled Banner (album), an album by Pat Boone, 1963
 "The Star Spangled Banner" (Whitney Houston recording), 1991

See also